Composite or hybrid muscles are those muscles which have more than one set of fibers but perform the same function and are usually supplied by different nerves for different set of fibers.

Examples
 Brachialis: Musculocutaneous nerve is motor and radial nerve is proprioceptive.
 Adductor magnus : Its adductor part by posterior division of obturator nerve and hamstring part by tibial part of sciatic nerve.
 Biceps femoris: Its long head is supplied by the tibial part of sciatic nerve, whereas the short head is supplied by the common peroneal nerve. This reflects the composite derivation from the flexor and extensor musculature.
 Pectineus: Its anterior set of fibers are supplied by the femoral nerve, whereas posterior set of fibers are supplied by the obturator nerve.
 Flexor digitorum profundus: Its radial half of is supplied by the median nerve and the ulnar half is supplied by the ulnar nerve.
 Flexor policis brevis: Supplied by recurrent branch of the median nerve and the deep branch of the ulnar nerve
 Iliopsoas:Supplied by spiral nerve and femoral nerve
 The tongue is a composite muscle made up of various components like longitudinal, transverse, horizontal muscles with different parts innervated having different nerve supply.
Digastric muscle: Its anterior belly is supplied by nerve to mylohyoid (a branch of trigeminal nerve). The posterior belly is supplied by the facial nerve.
Pectoralis major: supplied by medial and lateral pectoral nerves.

Commonly confused
Certain muscles are commonly confused with composite muscles which they are not. Examples are:
 Rectus femoris
 Omohyoid
 Occipitofrontalis
 Ligament of Trietz

References

 Cunningham's textbook of anatomy (old edition)

Muscular system
Somatic motor system